SilkAir 185: Pilot Suicide? is a 2006 documentary film by Hong Kong-based independent production company APV. Its subject is the crash of SilkAir Flight 185. The 60-minute documentary features interviews with air crash investigators who were involved in the case, relatives of those who were killed in the disaster, and lawyers who brought suit on behalf of the victims' families as well. The documentary features recreations of the events leading up to the crash, and computer simulations of the crash itself.

SilkAir 185: Pilot Suicide? was commissioned by the National Geographic Channel Asia and the Singapore Economic Development Board Documentary Commissioning fund. The documentary, written and produced by APV's Creative Director Mike Barrett, received a "Highly Commended" award in the category "Best Documentary Programme (31 minutes or more)" at the 2006 Asian Television Awards.

References

Documentary films about aviation accidents or incidents
Documentary films about suicide
Documentary television films
Hong Kong documentary films
Documentary films about crime
2006 films
2006 documentary films
2000s Hong Kong films